The Princess' Man is a 2011 South Korean television series, starring Park Si-hoo, Moon Chae-won, Kim Yeong-cheol, Song Jong-ho, Hong Soo-hyun and Lee Soon-jae. It's a period drama about the forbidden romance between the daughter of Grand Prince Suyang and the son of Kim Jong-seo, Suyang's political opponent. It aired on KBS2 from July 20 to October 6, 2011, on Wednesdays and Thursdays at 21:55 for 24 episodes.

Plot
The Grand Prince Suyang attempts to build an alliance with his brother King Munjong's trusted prime minister, Kim Jong-seo's family. He proposes a marriage between his eldest daughter Se-ryung and Jong-seo's son, Kim Seung-yoo. Learning of this, Se-ryung's curiosity regarding her prospective husband is piqued. On hearing that Kim Seung-yoo is going to take over as her cousin Princess Gyeonghye's's new tutor, she persuades her to swap places with her so that she can catch a glimpse of her intended. Her first impression is not favorable and she is convinced that he is an arrogant womanizer. Later, as she attempts to master her current obsession with riding a horse, her horse runs away with her and Seung-yoo arrives in the nick of time to rescue her from being thrown off a precipice.

Meanwhile, Kim Jong-seo rejects Suyang's proposal because he knows the Prince's aspirations regarding the throne and allies himself firmly with King Munjong. King Munjong is impressed with Seung-yoo as a capable teacher and sees merit in having him on his side as a son-in-law, who is strong enough to protect the Crown Prince. He announces that Seung-yoo has been chosen as the Prince Consort. Seung-yoo, who still believes Se-ryung is the Princess, is glad of the decision because of his growing feelings for her. Beginning to understand her passion to escape the confines of her cloistered life, he offers to teach her how to ride. Their blissful time together is cut short, by an unexpected attack by bandits sent by Suyang to assassinate Seung-yoo as revenge against Kim Jong-seo. Seung-yoo is injured and as Se-ryung risks her life to save him, the Chief Magistrate of the Capital's Police Bureau, Shin Myeon, chances to pass by and saves them. Shin Myeon also happens to be Seung-yoo's best friend, along with Jung Jong, whose noble family has fallen on harsh straits.  Meanwhile, Seung-yoo and Se-ryung meet outside the palace again. Even though Shin Myeon senses his friend's growing admiration for Se-ryung, he too finds himself drawn to the brave and beautiful girl. His dilemma grows when Grand Prince Suyang offers Se-ryung's hand in marriage to him in the hope of building an alliance with his politician father.

Se-ryung learns that Seung-yoo is chosen as the candidate for Prince Consort and is devastated. Her cousin, Princess Gyeonghye understands the political import of marrying Seung-yoo and orders her not to meet Seung-yoo again, suspecting that the two are falling in love. Meanwhile, Seung-yoo and Se-ryung meet outside the palace again. However, they are tailed by Suyang's spies. Following their time together, Seung-yoo writes a letter to Se-ryung and sends it to the real Princess Gyeonghye, who, understanding that they met despite her orders, is furious. At the next lesson, she locks up Se-ryung and takes her place, thereby revealing the deception to Seung-yoo. However she hides Se-ryung's identity from him by calling her a palace maid who took her place.

The letter discarded by Princess Gyeonghye falls into the hands of Suyang. Using the letter, he demands that Seung-yoo be disqualified as a candidate for Prince Consort, insinuating that he dishonored the Princess by meeting her outside the palace. When interrogated, Seung-yoo says he did not meet the Princess outside but hides Se-ryung's part in it to spare her danger. Learning of the danger to Seung-yoo's life, Se-ryung begs Princess Gyeonghye to intercede for Seung-yoo. Despite her intercession, the penalty for Seung-yoo's transgression is death. Suyang discovers Se-ryung when she secretly visits Seung-yoo in prison and is horrified to learn of their dalliance. Relieved that Seung-yoo does not know who she is, he agrees to save Seung-yoo if she never meets him again and never reveals her identity to him. Kim Jong-seo, desperate to save his son, approaches Suyang for help and agrees to pay the humiliating price of resigning his Vice Premiership. Seung-yoo's sentence is commuted to temporary exile. In place of Seung-yoo, Jung Jong is chosen as Prince Consort, bringing a drastic change in his fortunes. He is smitten with the Princess from the beginning; however, she detests him. Se-ryung's relationship with Gyeonghye is also strained, with the Princess blaming her cousin for all the misfortunes she has undergone.

King Munjong collapses on the day of his daughter's wedding and his health takes a turn for the worse. Seung-yoo is summoned back by his brother, in order to assist their father in safeguarding the interests of the king. Seung-yoo runs into Se-ryung on his return but coldly severs all ties with her. However, Se-ryung's concern for her cousin coupled with the fact that Jung Jong is Seung-yoo's friend, force the two to meet again. Both find it hard to repress their feelings and finally Seung-yoo declares his love for her. However, at exactly the same time, King Munjong dies. Suyang and his cronies arrive at the palace, jubilant that they can now control the Crown Prince. However, their plans are thwarted by Kim Jong-seo, who was reinstated by the dead king to protect his son from Suyang's machinations. Furious, Suyang vows to kill Kim Jong-seo.

As Se-ryung and Seung-yoo blissfully revel in their love, Suyang prepares to stage a coup against Kim Seung-yoo. Se-ryung stumbles on the plot too late and is foiled in her attempts to warn Seung-yoo and his family by her parents. Supported by Shin Myeon, Suyang ruthlessly murders his opponents, including Seung-yoo's father and brother. Shin Myeon, believing that Seung-yoo is dead, stops the other men from beheading him claiming he wishes to do it himself. As he is about to bury him, Shin Myeon realizes that Seung-yoo is (barely) alive and attempts to kill him but fails. He turns around and leaves, giving Seung-yoo the chance to escape with his life.

Seung-yoo wakes up and walks into the town to find that his father has been beheaded. Reeling from his best friend's betrayal, he tries to kill Suyang, only to be shocked to discover that Se-ryung is his daughter. Seung-yoo is sentenced to be killed. However, a last minute intercession by the Crown Prince saves his life and he is exiled to Kanghwa Island, along with the rest of Suyang's enemies. When Se-ryung visits him in prison on the eve of his exile, his fury gets the better of him and he nearly chokes her to death. Se-ryung admits her identity and begs him to survive, even if it is just so that he can kill her.

En route Kanghwa Island, the ship is sunk to ensure that none of Suyang's enemies survive. However, aided by a fellow prisoner, Jo Seok-joo, Seung-yoo manages to escape and return. Taking refuge at the gisaeng house Bing Og Gwan, owned by Seok-joo, Seung-yoo plots his revenge. Meanwhile, Se-ryung learns that Seung-yoo's ship sank. Despite her mourning, her parents fix the date of her wedding with Shin Myeon.

In an attempt to bait Suyang, he kidnaps Se-ryung on the day of her wedding. He is mercilessly cruel to her, and reveals her father's part in the sinking of the ship. Suyang shows up to claim his beloved daughter but he survives Seung-yoo's arrow because of his armor. Meanwhile, Shin Myeon shoots an arrow at Seung-yoo, which is intercepted by Se-ryung who takes the brunt of it. Shaken by her sacrifice on his behalf, Seung-yoo is shell shocked and he escapes only because Seok-joo and his friend Noh-gyul save him by forcibly dragging him away from her prone body.

Se-ryung is taken home by her father and Shin Myeon is suspicious because she took the arrow on behalf of her kidnapper. However, the encounter with Seung-yoo and the kidnapping changes Se-ryung's attitude towards her father and Shin Myeon, now that she is aware of the extent to which they will go for power. Seung-yoo reveals that he is alive to Jung Jong and he is relieved to have an ally in the fight against Suyang. Foiled in his attempt to kill Suyang, Seung-yoo starts assassinating those who were privy to his family's murder. He leaves behind the alias of his deceased general father, Great Tiger, at each site to stir fear among his enemies. Se-ryung's attempts to atone for her father's atrocities gradually melts Seung-yoo's anger, especially when he learns that she saved his sister-in-law and niece's lives in the reprisal against the members of the rebel nobles' families. Grand Prince Suyang forces King Danjong to abdicate, and becomes crowned King Sejo of Joseon. Se-ryung refuses to be crowned Princess and continues to bravely defy her father.

Seung-yoo gives up his vigilante assassinations at the behest of his old teacher, who urges him to join the larger cause of dethroning Sejo and restoring Danjong. Se-ryung inadvertently learns of the plot and is caught in a terrible dilemma. Saving her father comes at the cost of her love and vice versa. However, the rebellion which was led by Six Scholars of the Hall of Worthies, including Seung-yoo's teacher fails, leading to their deaths and the exile of Princess Gyeonghye and her husband Jung Jong.

Seung-yoo manages to escape, but Shin Myeon discovers his identity. King Sejo learns that Seung-yoo is alive and that Se-ryung may have had knowledge of the plot. The rift between father and daughter grows. Se-ryung in a symbolic move, cuts her hair and renounces her ties to her father. When she takes refuge in a temple after leaving the palace, Seung-yoo takes her with him to Bing Og Gwan. However, when Shin Myeon and his guards nearly tear apart the place searching for her, she surrenders herself up to them. In his rage, King Sejo sentences her to become a slave of Shin Myeon. However, Seung-yoo and his friends rescue her in the nick of time. Shin Myeon refuses to give up his quest to possess Se-ryung and follows the pair to Princess Gyeonghye and Jung Jong's place of exile. In the course of Jung Jong protecting the pair, Shin Myeon comes to learn that Jung Jong is plotting yet another rebellion. He is arrested and executed, leaving behind a devastated and pregnant Gyeonghye.

Meanwhile, in addition to their grief over the loss of Jung Jong, the lovers face more obstacles. The rebel leaders with whom Seung-yoo continues the plan for the attack refuse to accept her, because of her link to King Sejo. Seung-yoo and Se-ryung pledge their love as husband and wife and agree to separate till the battle is over. However, when Shin Myeon plans to use Se-ryung as bait to lure Seung-yoo, she escapes and warns her husband. In the  battle that follows, Shin Myeon is killed and Seung-yoo's side wins. Seung-yoo moves forward with his plan to assassinate the king and nearly succeeds, but for a momentary distraction caused by learning of Se-ryung's pregnancy. Seung-yoo is sent to jail, and Se-ryung goes to see him, wanting her baby to at least know who his or her father is. Seung-yoo nearly dies and Se-ryung accepts her fate. However, Se-ryung's mother orchestrates their escape.

Years later Seung-yoo has become blind after his brush with death. However, both of them now have a lovely daughter and are happy, even if they are poor. In the backdrop of their bliss, we see an aged King Sejo who has let go of his bitterness and who watches his daughter's happiness in secret.

Cast

Main characters
Moon Chae-won as Lee Se-ryung (이세령, 李世姈)
The eldest and favorite daughter of Grand Prince Suyang, she is a bright and sweet person, with an adventurous streak. She persuades her cousin, Princess Gyeonghye, to exchange places with her during a tutoring session with Kim Seung-yoo, upon learning of her father's initial plans to arrange her marriage with him. A harmless prank to sneak a peek at her intended husband spirals out of control as they fall deeply in love with each other, ignorant of the deep and deadly political enmity that slowly develops between their fathers. After Kim Seung-yoo is chosen by the King as a candidate for Prince Consort, Grand Prince Suyang promises Se-ryung's hand in marriage to Shin Myeon, Kim Seung-yoo's best friend. As the truth of her father's machinations and atrocities gradually dawns on her, Se-ryung begins to resist her father's power and Shin Myeon's advances. However, she is trapped by the knowledge that saving Kim Seung-yoo's life means the death of her family, while the price of his life is the cost of saving them. When her father is crowned as King, Se-ryung becomes a Princess, but as she learns more about her father's cruel grasp for power, she battles her loyalty to her family with the love she bears for Seung-yoo, as well as the knowledge that his cause is the right one.
Park Si-hoo as Kim Seung-yoo (김승유, 金承琉)
As the second son of Kim Jong-seo, a prominent military officer who serves as the Deputy Prime Minister of Joseon, he is a carefree scholar in the Royal Academy, whose main interests are having a good time with the ladies and spending time with his close friends, Shin Myeon and Jung Jong. He meets his match in the spirited Se-ryung, whom he thinks is the Princess, and he is drawn to her from their very first meeting. Not knowing about this deception, it seems to him that the road to love is propitious, especially when the King selects him as the candidate for Prince Consort. As he falls harder for her, his love is put to the ultimate test when he learns that Se-ryung is not the Princess, but rather the daughter of his father's biggest enemy. After Grand Prince Suyang kills his father and brother and sentences him to exile, Seung-yoo escapes and transforms himself into a cold and ruthless assassin. Bent on exacting vengeance for the murder of his family, he steels his heart against his love for Se-ryung, believing that she was party to his downfall. Though Se-ryung's selfless love and bravery moves his heart in the end, he cannot turn his back on the fight against the King, her father.
Kim Yeong-cheol as Grand Prince Suyang (수양대군, 首陽大君)
Younger brother of King Munjong, he has his eyes firmly fixed on the throne. He is a ruthless politician, who will not countenance anyone standing in his way. Se-ryung, his eldest daughter, is his weakness, but when she falls in love with the son of his enemy, he has no compunctions in eliminating Kim Seung-yoo and his entire family. He brutally eliminates the supporters of his young nephew, King Danjong, and finally forces him to abdicate the throne. He becomes the King of Joseon, but is haunted by dreams of his crimes.
Hong Soo-hyun as Princess Gyeonghye (경혜공주, 敬惠公主)
Se-ryung's cousin and friend, she is King Munjong's only legitimate daughter. She is indulged by her father and revels in the adulation she receives as the most beautiful woman in the land, but the sudden knowledge of her father's illness and Grand Prince Suyang's political threat to her young brother, who is next in line for the throne, destroys her sheltered and uncomplicated life. Convinced of the importance of allying with Kim Jong-seo's family, she tries to separate Seung-yoo and Se-ryung. However, as the political machinations of Grand Prince Suyang unfold, she finds herself trapped in an unwanted marriage with Jung Jong. But as her uncle systematically destroys her allies one by one, she begins to find solace and comfort in her husband's love. After Jung Jong's death, she gives birth to their child.
Song Jong-ho as Shin Myeon (신면, 申沔)
He is a Magistrate Officer at the Capital Bureau, who enjoys a deep camaraderie with his friends. When he saves Kim Seung-yoo and Se-ryung from an attack by bandits, the girl's bravery arouses his interest. What begins as a crush on his best friend's girl has devastating consequences when his father strikes an alliance with Grand Prince Suyang and marriage is on the cards for both of them. Finding himself wanting Se-ryung more and more, he ultimately decides to betray his own friend, even attempting to kill him. As Se-ryung rejects his advances, his obsession with her grows and he becomes willing to pay any price Suyang requires of him.
Lee Min-woo as Jung Jong (정종, 鄭悰)
The gentle and perpetually debt-ridden friend of Seung-yoo and Shin Myeon, he finds himself deeply in love after he crashes into a palanquin bearing Princess Gyeonghye and is promptly slapped by her. His fortunes take a turn for the better and in an amazing twist of destiny, he finds himself as the Prince Consort. However, his new bride, helplessly carrying the burden of her father's illness and the danger to her brother's life, initially has no time or inclination for his love. Jung Jong finds that he cannot remain apolitical and neutral and he too must take a stand in the political struggle. Just as his relationship with his wife begins to improve, his life is endangered in an attempt to resist Grand Prince Suyang.
Lee Soon-jae as Kim Jong-seo (김종서, 金宗瑞)
The brilliant Deputy Prime Minister of Joseon and the most trusted advisor of King Munjong, he alienates Grand Prince Suyang when he accepts Princess Gyeonghye instead of Suyang's daughter as bride for his younger son. He pays the price of his misalliance with his life and the destruction of his family.

Supporting characters

 Um Hyo-sup as Yi Gae, the former teacher of Seung-yoo, Jong and Myeon
 Heo Jung-kyu as Kim Seung-gyu, Seung-yoo's older brother
 Lee Joo-seok as Grand Prince Anpyeong
 Kim Seo-ra as Lady Yoon, Grand Prince Suyang's wife
 Cha Min-ji as Yeo-ri
 Kwon Hyun-sang as Lee Soong, Se-ryung's brother
 Seo Hye-jin as Lee Se-jung, Se-ryung's younger sister
 Jung Dong-hwan as King Munjong
 Noh Tae-yeob as King Danjong, later Prince Nosan
 Ban So-young as Eun-geum, Princess Gyeonghye's maid
 Lee Hyo-jung as Shin Suk-ju
 Lee Dae-yeon as Kwon Ram
 Yoon Seung-won as Prince Onyeong
 Kwon Tae-won as Min Shin
 Kim Ik-tae as Jo Geuk-gwan
 Kim Young-bae as Jun Gyun
 Choi Moo-sung as Ham-gwi
 Jung Jin as Chil-gap
 Jung Geun as Mak-son
 Lee Hee-do as Han Myung-hoi
 Moon Poong-ji as eunuch Moon
 Lee El as Mae-hyang
 Jin Sung as Song Ja-beon
 Ga Deuk-hee as Lady Ryu, Kim Seung-gyu's wife
 Kim Yoo-bin as Kim Ah-kang
 Yoo Ha-joon as Im Woon
 Hong Il-kwon as Grand Prince Geumseong
 Kim Roi-ha as Jo Seok-joo
 Yoon Jong-hwa as Jun Noh-gul
 Choo So-young as Cho-hee
 Choi Han-bit as Moo-young
 Lee Seul-bi as So-aeng
 Lee Hee-joon as Gong Chil-goo

Ratings

Awards and nominations

International broadcast
On September 2, 2012, members of the cast, namely Park Si-hoo, Song Jong-ho and Hong Soo-hyun, attended a promotional concert at Tokyo International Forum to promote the airing of the series on Japanese satellite channel BNK-BS.

It aired in the Philippines on the GMA Network from November 19, 2012 until February 7, 2013.

It aired in Sri Lanka on TV Derana under the title Sihina Kumara (සිහින කුමරා) from March 2014.

It aired in Australia and New Zealand on eMedia Network's iON broadcasting service Lanka Vision, a broadcasting service aimed at Sri Lankan Australians and Sri Lankan New Zealanders, via a live and delayed feed from Sri Lankan network, TV Derana in 2014.

It aired in Kurdistan on Kurdsat under the title Seung Yoo (سۆنگ یو).

It aired in Thailand on Channel 7 under the title Jomnang Kabot Huajai (จอมนางกบฏหัวใจ) from July 30, 2015.

It aired in Chile on ETC TV under the title El Hombre De La Princesa in August 2018, dubbed in Spanish.

It aired in Peru on Willax TV under the title El Hombre De La Princesa in July 2019 and October 2020, dubbed in Spanish.

References

External links

  
 
 
 

Korean-language television shows
2011 South Korean television series debuts
2011 South Korean television series endings
Korean Broadcasting System television dramas
Television series by KBS Media
Television series set in the Joseon dynasty
South Korean historical television series